Billy Hufsey (born December 8, 1958 in Brook Park, Ohio) is an American actor and singer.

Career
Billy Hufsey was on television from 1983 to 1987, playing the role of Christopher Donlon on the NBC/syndicated drama, Fame. He went on to play Emilio Ramirez on the daytime drama, Days of Our Lives from 1987 to 1991. The producers of Days of Our Lives had him write and perform several songs for the show, including "I'll Be There" and "Only This Time". In 1989, Billy recorded and released his album, Contagious. He also toured the world from Italy, Israel, Canada to Las Vegas and many more.

Billy's other television credits include Married... with Children, Webster, The Young and the Restless, General Hospital, Rags to Riches, and Baby Talk. He has also had roles in several movies, which include Tomcats, Zero Tolerance, Crazy Girls Undercover, Cold Nights into Dawn, Round Trip to Heaven, Off the Wall, and Graduation Day.

In 1985, Billy was featured nude, covered only by a towel, on a popular poster, which is still for sale today. The poster was also used in a scene in the British film The Fruit Machine.

On December 12, 2008 Billy performed a free Christmas concert in his home town of Cleveland, Ohio to raise money for "Feed a Family", a local charity that provides food to families in need.

On January 4, 2009, Billy starred on VH1's Confessions of a Teen Idol, a reality show in which former teen idols attempt to revitalize their entertainment careers. He said that he enjoyed his time in the house with the other six idols, as they all learned from each other.

Later in 2009, he was in the film Radio Needles and in 2011, he co-produced the Jadagrace Show.

Sources

External links

 Billy Hufsey "Live" Interview On Uncensored Net Noise Jan 9, 2009

1958 births
Living people
American male soap opera actors
Male actors from Cleveland
Musicians from Cleveland
People from Cuyahoga County, Ohio